Locmaria-Plouzané is a commune in the Finistère department of Brittany in north-western France.

Population
Inhabitants of Locmaria-Plouzané are called in French Lanvénécois.

Breton language
The municipality launched a linguistic plan concerning the Breton language through Ya d'ar brezhoneg on 20 June 2008.

See also
Communes of the Finistère department

References

External links

Official website 

Mayors of Finistère Association 

Communes of Finistère